Kristina Marie Stephens (born January 21, 1987) is an American singer and songwriter. She has written songs for artists such as Shakira, Pitbull, Chris Brown, Jennifer Lopez, LeToya Luckett and Keyshia Cole. As an artist, her vocals have been featured on tracks alongside T.I., Kendrick Lamar, B.o.B, Iggy Azalea, Young Dro and more. She is currently working on her debut album.

Life and career
Stephens began writing poetry when she was nine, singing solos in church and school. She attended Towson University, where she studied business management until she realized she'd been writing songs in class instead of paying attention, leading her to drop out so she could focus on music.

Stephens moved to Atlanta and joined a girl group, and although her time with the group was limited, R&B singer Tank took notice and the two formed a long-term writing partnership and eventually moved in together for a brief period of time. Tank featured her on his song "Compliments" along with rapper T.I., and on set for the music video, Stephens built a rapport with T.I.; he heard her music and decided to go into business with Tank on her behalf.

In 2013, Stephens was featured on T.I.'s single "Memories Back Then", which also featured B.o.B and Kendrick Lamar, as well as "Chasing Me," alongside Iggy Azalea and Young Dro. That same year, she released a cover of Aaliyah's "One in a Million" and signed a major publishing deal with Primary Wave Music through super producer RoccStar.

Discography

As a featured artist

Songwriting discography

References

External links
 Kris Stephens discography at Discogs
 Kris Stephens credits or Kristina Stephens credits at AllMusic

1987 births
Living people
21st-century American women singers
African-American women singer-songwriters
American women pop singers
American women hip hop singers
American women singer-songwriters
American rhythm and blues singer-songwriters
Singer-songwriters from Maryland
21st-century American singers
21st-century African-American women singers
20th-century African-American people
20th-century African-American women